Layes Abdullayeva (born 29 May 1991 in Ethiopia) is Ethiopian-born Azerbaijani international middle and long-distance track and field athlete, running in the disciplines of 1500 m, 3000 m and 5000 m, but also 10000 m.

Achievements

References

External links
 

1991 births
Living people
Azerbaijani female long-distance runners
Azerbaijani female middle-distance runners
Athletes (track and field) at the 2012 Summer Olympics
Olympic athletes of Azerbaijan
Azerbaijani steeplechase runners
Female steeplechase runners
Competitors at the 2011 Summer Universiade
Islamic Solidarity Games competitors for Azerbaijan